When Nietzsche Wept is a 2007 American art drama film directed by Pinchas Perry and starring Armand Assante, Ben Cross and Katheryn Winnick. It is based on the novel of the same name by Irvin D. Yalom. It was filmed in Bulgaria.

Plot
The film opens with the Russian-born novelist—who eventually became a member of Freud's 'Vienna Circle'—Lou Andreas-Salome (Katheryn Winnick) who had an unconsummated (Platonic) 'love affair' with German philosopher Friedrich Nietzsche (Armand Assante), and to whom he allegedly proposed in 1882 (although whether her claims are true is very much up for debate) writing a letter to Dr Josef Breuer (Ben Cross), after hearing of his newly developed talking cure (Breuer was a friend of Sigmund Freud (Jamie Elman), who also appears in the story, and one of the influential fathers of psychoanalysis). The two meet, and a reluctant and troubled Breuer agrees to Salome's plan; to cure the intense migraine attacks that plague Nietzsche, and at the same time, without his knowing, cure the despair that her refusal of marriage has inflicted upon him.

Salome has persuaded Franz Overbeck (Nietzsche's friend) to send him to Breuer, however, Nietzsche offers no support to Breuer, so the course of treatment must end. In a chilling parallel, an encounter with a mistreated horse causes Nietzsche to redeem his appointment with Breuer (Nietzsche finally went mad after stopping a man from whipping a horse using his own body, before breaking down in tears and descending into insanity). Nietzsche later visits a whorehouse, where he has another attack of migraine, exacerbated by the overuse of a sleeping draught. Nietzsche decides that he will, instead of pursuing treatment, leave for Basel. Meanwhile, an up-and-coming psychologist Sigmund Freud, friend of Josef and his spouse Mathilde Breuer, suggests that if Breuer was to make some confession to Nietzsche, he may stop seeing any positive sentiment shown as being a bid for power, and indulge in confessions of his own.

So, the next time they met, Breuer makes the suggestion that, while he treats Nietzsche's body, Nietzsche must "treat" Breuer of the despair that he feels after falling in love with one of his patients, Bertha Pappenheim (played by Michal Yannai), otherwise known as Anna O., a famous case which was discussed in a joint book by Breuer and Freud, later on.

The confessions lead to the two becoming open with each other, learning each other's way of life and finally the two becoming friends, but not before the film has explored a great deal of Nietzsche's philosophy and Breuer's psychoanalysis. Breuer's anguish over his supposed unhappiness is explored by means of his highly symbol-laden dreams, thus showing the importance of interpretation as a stepping stone in what would constitute Freud's approach to psychoanalytic techniques.

Cast 

 Ben Cross as Josef Breuer
 Armand Assante as Friedrich Nietzsche
 Joanna Pacula as Mathilde Breuer
 Michal Yannai as Bertha Pappenheim
 Jamie Elman as Sigmund Freud
 Andreas Beckett as Zarathustra
 Katheryn Winnick as Lou Salome
 Rachel O'Meara as Frau Becker
 Yzhar Charuzi as Hush Man
 Ilan Charusi as Carmen Barman
 Tal Fructer as Girl by Pianist
 Silvia Terzieva as Mrs. Fiefer
 Ivaylo Brusovki as Mendel Fiefer
 Paula Dominguez as Mia Breuer

Historical accuracy

The film is largely fictional, though many facts and actually occurring events are taken from the characters' real lives and inserted into the film for narrative purposes. The book from which the film was based was an exploration of the hypothetical conjunction of Nietzsche's and Breuer's and Freud's destinies and the development of psychoanalysis, of which Nietzsche's thought played a significant part.

Besides the historical characters directly depicted, through the film there are also references to Paul Rée, Franz Overbeck and Richard Wagner.

References

External links 
 
 When Nietzsche Wept at AllMovie
 When Nietzsche Wept at FilmAffinity

2007 films
Films with atheism-related themes
American independent films
American drama films
2007 drama films
Films about Friedrich Nietzsche
Films based on American novels
Films set in the 1880s
Films set in Vienna
Films shot in Bulgaria
Cultural depictions of Sigmund Freud
Cultural depictions of Josef Breuer
Films about psychiatry
Films about philosophy
2000s English-language films
2000s American films